Vrboec is a village in the municipality of Kruševo, North Macedonia.

Demographics
In statistics gathered by Vasil Kanchov in 1900, the village of Vrboec was inhabited by 24 Christian Bulgarians and 150 Muslim Albanians. 

According to the 2021 census, the village had a total of 227 inhabitants. Ethnic groups in the village include:

Macedonians 255
Others 1

References

Villages in Kruševo Municipality